Limets Peninsula is the predominantly ice-free peninsula forming the northwest extremity of Low Island in the South Shetland Islands.  The feature is projecting 3.3 km northwards and 2.4 km wide.  It is bounded by Kazichene Cove and Smochevo Cove to the west and Berraz Bay to the east, and ends in Cape Wallace to the north.  The area was visited by early 19th century sealers.

The feature is named after the settlement of Limets in Southern Bulgaria.

Location
British mapping in 1968 and 2009.

Maps
 South Shetland Islands: Smith and Low Islands. Scale 1:150000 topographic map No. 13677. British Antarctic Survey, 2009
 Antarctic Digital Database (ADD). Scale 1:250000 topographic map of Antarctica. Scientific Committee on Antarctic Research (SCAR). Since 1993, regularly upgraded and updated

References
 Limets Peninsula. SCAR Composite Antarctic Gazetteer.
 Bulgarian Antarctic Gazetteer. Antarctic Place-names Commission. (details in Bulgarian, basic data in English)

External links
 Limets Peninsula. Copernix satellite image

Bulgaria and the Antarctic
Peninsulas of the South Shetland Islands